Petalonema is a genus of cyanobacteria. These species occur in freshwater habitats, on rocks, in soil, and as epiphytes.

Species include:
Petalonema alatum
Petalonema crassum
Petalonema crustaceum
Petalonema densum
Petalonema fluminalis
Petalonema incrustans
Petalonema involvens
Petalonema pulchrum
Petalonema velutinum

References

Nostocales
Cyanobacteria genera